Haji Yaqoob Qureshi (born 1 January 1959) is a Former Minister of Uttar Pradesh Government. He is elected former MLA of Bahujan Samaj Party.

Biography
Haji yaqoob Quraishi was elected from the Meerut seat in 2007 as a UPUDF candidate. After this he changed his party to Bahujan Samaj Party (BSP). In 2012.

He contested the 2019 Lok Sabha elections from Meerut-Hapur lok sabha on BSP ticket. He lost  by BJP Candidate Rajendra Agrawal.By 3000 votes

Controversy
He offered an $11 million reward for the death of cartoonists who drew cartoons that showed disrespect for Islam or the Muhammad.
After the 2015 shooting at the Charlie Hebdo office in Paris, he announced the prize to be taken in cash from him.

References

Living people
Uttar Pradesh politicians
1959 births
Bahujan Samaj Party politicians from Uttar Pradesh